

Kilkenny managerial history

References

Hurling managers
 
Kilkenny